Rendezvous in Paris is a 1995 French romantic comedy anthology film written and directed by Éric Rohmer.

The film consists of three loosely connected episodes revolving around chance meetings in Paris: "Le Rendez-vous de 7 heures" ("The Rendezvous at 7 P.M."), in which a student discovers her boyfriend is two-timing her; "Les Bancs de Paris" ("The Benches of Paris"), in which an unnamed woman has a series of meetings in parks with a handsome literature teacher from the suburbs; and "Mere et enfant 1907" ("Mother and Child 1907"), which takes its title from a Picasso painting, and centres on an artist who is attracted by a stranger. The three stories of the film are linked by a girl singing in the streets to an accordion accompaniment—a homage to René Clair's Under the Roofs of Paris (1930).

Cast

"Le Rendez-vous de 7 heures" 
 Clara Bellar as Esther
 Antoine Basler as Horace
  as flirt
 Judith Chancel as Aricie
 Malcolm Conrath as Félix
 Cécile Parès as Hermione
 Olivier Poujol as coffee-shop waiter

"Les Bancs de Paris"
 Aurore Rauscher as Elle
 Serge Renko as Lui

"Mère et enfant, 1907"
 Michael Kraft as painter
  as young woman
 Veronika Johansson as Swedish woman

Musette à Mouffetard
 Florence Levu as street singer
 Christian Bassoul as accordion player

See also
 Rendezvous in Chicago (2018)

References

External links
 
 
 

1995 films
1995 romantic comedy films
1990s French-language films
Films directed by Éric Rohmer
Films set in Paris
Films shot in Paris
French anthology films
French romantic comedy films
1990s French films